PWS may refer to:
 Pressure wave supercharger, a type of super-charger technology
Performance work statement, term used to summarize the work that needs to be done for a contract
 Personal weather station, a weather station owned and operated by an individual or a non-weather-related club or business
 Personal web server, system of hardware and software that is designed to create and manage a web server on a desktop computer
Microsoft Personal Web Server, a scaled-down web server software for Windows operating systems
 Present weather sensor, a component of an automatic weather station that detects the presence of hydrometeors and determines their type (rain, snow, drizzle, etc.) and intensity
 Professional Wetland Scientist, a certification for practicing wetland professionals that signifies stringent academic and work experience standards of wetland science have been met
 Public Warning System, a 3GPP network system used for alerting the public to events such as disasters
 Podlaska Wytwórnia Samolotów, a Polish aircraft manufacturer
 Prader–Willi syndrome, a genetic disorder due to loss of function of specific genes
 Progetto Winston Smith, known in English as the Winston Smith Project, a human rights project
 Progressive Web Site, a web authoring framework or technology incorporating HTML5, CSS, and JavaScript that harnesses most features and capabilities of an app, without having to install one
 Purwosari railway station, a railway station in Indonesia (station code)